Mudéjar architecture of Aragon is an aesthetic trend in Mudéjar style in Aragon, (Spain) and has been recognized in some representative buildings as a World Heritage Site by UNESCO.

The chronology of the Aragonese Mudéjar occupies 12th to the 17th century and includes more than a hundred architectural monuments located predominantly in the valleys of the Ebro, Jalón and Jiloca.

The first manifestations of Aragonese Mudéjar have two origins: on the one hand, a palatial architecture linked to the monarchy, which amends and extends the Aljafería Palace maintaining Islamic ornamental tradition, and on the other hand, a tradition which develops Romanesque architecture using brickwork rather than masonry construction and which often displays Hispanic-rooted ornamental tracery. Examples of the latter type of Mudéjar architecture can be seen in churches in Daroca, which were started in stone and finished off in the 13th century with Mudéjar brick panels.

From a structural point of view, the Mudéjar architecture in Aragon preferably adopts functional schemes of Cistercian Gothic, but with some differences. Buttresses are often absent, especially in the apses which characteristically have an octagonal floor plan with thick walls that can hold the thrust from the roof and which provide space to highlight brick decorations. On the other hand, buttresses are often a feature of the naves, where they may be topped by turrets, as in the style of the Basilica of Our Lady of the Pillar. There may be side chapels which are not obvious from the exterior. Churches in neighborhoods (such as San Pablo of Zaragoza) or small towns do not usually have aisles, but locations for additional altars are provided by chapels between the nave buttresses. It is common for these side chapels to have a closed gallery or ándite (walkway), with windows looking to the outside and inside of the building. This constitution is called a church-fortress, and his prototype could be the church of Montalbán.

Typically the bell towers show extraordinary ornamental development, the structure being inherited from the Islamic minaret: quadrangular with central pier whose spaces are filled via a staircase approximation vaults, as in the Almohad minarets. On this body stood the tower, usually polygonal. There are also examples of octagonal towers.

World Heritage Site

In 1986, Unesco declared the whole Mudéjar complex of Teruel a World Heritage Site, which was extended in 2001 to include other Aragonese Mudejar monuments:

The description of the importance given so appropriated:

The justification for the statement is supported by the standard IV of the same organization:
Criterion IV:

See also
 List of Mudéjar buildings in Aragon: include non-World Heritage Sites.

References

Bibliography used
 Gonzalo Borrás Gualis, Mudejar art in Teruel, Teruel Studies Institute, 1990. .

External links 

UNESCO 'Aragon' World Heritage website
Explore the Mudéjar architecture of Aragón in the UNESCO collection on Google Arts and Culture
 Aragonese Mudejar Art, a complete book of Joseph Galiay Sarañana which is available free on the website of the Institution "Fernando el Católico."
 Aragonese Mudejar in the Government of Aragon website.
 Alphabetic index of Aragonese Mudejar.
 Aragonese Mudejar buildings belonging to the renowned World Heritage Site by UNESCO
 Online guide of Mudejar Aragonese Art.

 
 
Aragonese culture
Buildings and structures in Aragon
Architecture in Spain
World Heritage Sites in Spain